George Chetwynd (1824 – 3 December 1882) was the Receiver and Accountant General of the British Post Office. He conceived of the postal order in 1874 though it was 1 January 1881 before the first "post office notes" finally went on sale. Chetwynd's scheme was so successful that when the scheme started, around 1.5 million notes were printed by Bradbury Wilkinson but another million had to be printed by the end of 1881.

He died at Blackheath, London, aged 58.

References

Postal history
1824 births
1882 deaths